AT-3 may be:

 AT III, a protein in the coagulation system that is activated by Heparin
 AT-3 (jet trainer) of the Republic of China Air Force (Taiwan)
 AT-3 plane, Very Light Aircraft
 AT-3 Sagger, Soviet anti-tank missile
 AT-3 (MATH-MATIC) compiler for UNIVAC mainframe computers
 .at3, extension for audio files compressed with Sony's ATRAC3 algorithm
 Ar tonelico Qoga: Knell of Ar Ciel, a role-playing game for the PlayStation 3